The Leg Fighters (Chinese title: 南北腿王), also released as The Invincible Kung Fu Legs, is an independently released 1980 Hong Kong martial arts action film directed by Lee Tso-Nam and starring Tao-liang Tan and Ha Kwong-Li.

Plot
Phoenix (Ha Kwong-Li) is the prodigal daughter of sorts with a chip on her shoulder. She's asked to learn kung fu from kicking expert Mo Ku-fung (Sun Jung-Chi), but despises his harsh training. She and Chin Pan, her mischievous servant say good riddance when he leaves to attend to his sick wife. Replacing him is another top kicker named Tan Hai-chi (Tao-liang Tan) who resumes training. Phoenix transfers her disdain to Tan and their relationship sours until she gets mixed up with two idiot village bullies named Ding Dong and Dong Dong. Tan exploits the situation in order to humble Phoenix, who in turn agrees to be a dutiful student going forward. Focused leg training resumes until a vicious master of the ground kick named Peng Fung (Peng Kong) comes looking to avenge Tan's killing of his brother. Phoenix joins her new master in fighting Peng in a battle of leg mastery.

Cast
 Tao-liang Tan as Tan Hai-chi
 Ha Kwong-Li as Phoenix
 Wang Hsieh as Phoenix's father
 Peng Kong as Feng Fei and Feng Fa
 Sun Jung-Chi as Master Mo Ku-fung

External links 
 
 

Kung fu films
Hong Kong martial arts films
1980 martial arts films
1980 films
1980s Hong Kong films